Formica fusca is a black-colored ant commonly found throughout Europe as well as parts of Southern Asia and Africa. It has the common names silky ant or dusky ant. The range within the palaearctic region extends from Portugal in the west to Japan in the east and from Italy in the south to Fennoscandia in the north. Populations from North America have been split off as a separate species, Formica subaenescens. F. fusca nests are usually found in rotten tree stumps or under stones in clearcut areas and along woodland borders and hedgerows.

Eusociality
Colonies are facultatively polygynous (though weakly so, with a mean number of queen of 3.09); though the queens coexist amicably, contribution to the brood tends to be unequal. Nests are usually small, containing 500–2,000 workers. To ensure that non-nest mate eggs are not reared, these workers will engage in a process known as worker policing.

Alate (winged) forms are produced in June/July and nuptial flights are in July/August.

A study has found evidence of nepotism in F. fusca, in contrast with previous experiments with other ant species; this conclusion has been challenged, however, on the grounds that the observed pattern may result from differences in egg viability.

Ecology
F. fusca feeds on small insects such as codling moth larvae, aphid honeydew and extrafloral nectaries.

Workers have been found to have a very high resistance to some pathogens and it is thought this may be due to F. fusca utilising the antibiotic properties of their formic acid, additional to the use of their metapleural gland.

Behaviour 
Workers of this ant species can learn to associate an olfactory stimulus to a reward (sugar solution) during a classical conditioning protocol. Ants are fast to learn, and only a single presentation of the stimulus is enough for them to form a genuine long-term memory. This formed memory is also resistant to extinction.

The learning abilities of this species were tested using single compounds found in flower emission.

Ants of this species can also detect volatile organic compounds emitted by cancer cells. After a 3-trial conditioning, they can differenciate cancer cell lines (MCF-7) from healthy ones (MCF-10A). They can also discriminate one cell line (MCF-7) from another cancerous one (MDA-MD-231).

References

Further reading 

 
 

fusca
Hymenoptera of Europe
Hymenoptera of Asia
Ants described in 1758
Taxa named by Carl Linnaeus